A Speck in the Water (Filipino: Nunal Sa Tubig) is a 1976 Philippine drama film written by Jorge Arago and directed by Ishmael Bernal. It tells the story of a love triangle in the impoverished village involving Benjamin (George Estregan), a fisherman in Laguna de Bay, and two women in the villageーChedeng (Daria Ramirez), a soon-to-be midwife, and Maria (Elizabeth Oropesa), a beautiful young woman from the barrio.

It won Best Picture at the 1977 Catholic Mass Media Awards. It received seven nominations from the 1977 Gawad Urian including Best Picture, Best Screenplay, Best Cinematography, Best Production Design, and Best Sound. Daria Ramirez was nominated for Best Actress, while Bernal as nominated for Best Direction.

Plot 
The village of Sta. Fe, located in the middle of Laguna de Bay, was known for its milkfish pens and some investors from the capital investment for this kind of business to improve and develop this kind of business. However, the fish began to kill off, prompting the villagers to salt them and dry them under the sun for the sake of financial benefit. In the village, a love triangle was formed when Benjamin, the owner of a boat that serves as a shuttle service to the town, fell in love with Chedeng, a soon-to-be full-time trained midwife, and her best friend and neighbor, Maria. Both Chedeng and Maria didn't know that they were loved by Benjamin. By the time Maria got pregnant, Chedeng decides that she will be her first patient to handle her profession of midwifery. Unfortunately, this would lead to a tragic consequence, causing Chedeng to leave the village and live somewhere.

Cast 

Elizabeth Oropesa as Maria
Daria Ramirez as Chedeng
George Estregan as Benjamin
Ruben Rustia as Pedro
Pedro Faustino as Jacob
Ella Luansing as Banang
Rustica Carpio as Chayong
Nenita Jana as Adiang
Ven Medina as Mr. Blanco
Leticia de Guzman as Ilo
Tita De Villa as Mrs. Blanco
Paquito Salcedo as Elder
Lem Garcellano as Pablo
Mart Kenneth Rebamonte as Hukluban
Carlos Padilla Jr. as Dr. Villamaria
Tony Carreon as Lake Analyst

Also starring 

Bong Perez		
Joey Bolisay		
Rey TablaIda Bautista	
Al Garcia	
Jimmy Preña	
Erna Menesses	
Ricky Garcia
Milo Sario
Santiago Balse

Production

Filming
The film was shot in Laguna de Bay which is located in the province of Laguna and the town of Binangonan, Rizal.

Music
The film's music was composed and arranged by Winston Raval, who was credited as Vanishing Tribe.

Staff and crew 
Director: Ishmael Bernal
Writer: Jorge Arago
Producers: Emilio Ejercito and Jesse Ejercito
Music: Vanishing Tribe
Cinematography: Arnold Alvaro
Editor: Augusto Salvador
Art Director: Betty Gosiengfiao
Sound: Godofredo de Leon
Sound Supervisor: Manuel Daves
Sound Editor: Ruben Natividad
Casting Director: Angie Ferro
Production Supervisor: Edgar Garcia
Post-Production Supervisor: Zeny Ambos
Post-Production Facilities: LVN Pictures
Japanese Subtitles: Erwin John Soriano Viray and Kazuko Onoda

Release 
The film was released on August 6, 1976. It was approved for theatrical release by the Board of Censors for Motion Pictures (the predecessor of MTRCB).

Re-release
The restored version of the film was premiered on August 8, 2018, at the Cultural Center of the Philippines as part of the 14th Cinemalaya Independent Film Festival. The premiere was attended by the film's stars Elizabeth Oropesa and Daria Ramirez, actor Kiko Estrada (grandson of George Estregan), and the staff of the ABS-CBN Film Archives. Modern era film directors Adolfo Alix Jr. and Benedict Mique, Carmona Gale (representing the Kantana Post-Production), Sabrina Baracetti and Max Tessler (of Udine Far East Film Festival), and Ronald Arguelles (Cinema One - Channel Head) also attended the premiere.

Release dates

Digital restoration 
In the effort of restoring Nunal sa Tubig by the ABS-CBN Film Restoration Project, headed by Leonardo P. Katigbak, the sole element used for the restoration was the Japanese language-subtitled 35mm print that was stored from the audiovisual archives of the Fukuoka City Public Library Film Archives in Fukuoka City, Fukuoka, Japan. The 35mm print has been stored in the institution's archive collections since 2002, in addition to four other Filipino films acquired by the Japan Foundation.

The restoration of the film began with the digital scanning of the 35mm print to 4K resolution by Tokyo Ko-on Co. Ltd. in Tokyo, Japan, and digital restorations by Kantana Post-Production (Thailand). The aspect ratio for the restored version is 1:1.85. It took 3,600 restoration hours to eliminate numerous film defects including dust, scratches, and stains and it was successfully eliminated by more than 250 professional restoration artists of Kantana Post-Production in Thailand and India. The film restoration of Nunal sa Tubig was finished in February 2018.

Reception

Accolades

Critical reception
According to a description by the Manunuri ng Pelikulang Pilipino (Philippine Society of Respected Film Critics), the film employs "a quiet, experimental cinematic style, Ishmael Bernal’s opus recreates the quality and slow pace of life in a dying village surrounded by the sea, as it is caught in the eternal cycle of love and hate, of fertility and pollution, of birth and death."

References

Notes

External links 

1976 drama films
1976 films
Films directed by Ishmael Bernal
Star Cinema drama films
Star Cinema films
Tagalog-language films
1970s English-language films